Angela Phipps (born 17 February 1964) is a retired Canadian sprinter who specialised in the 100 and 200 metres.

She won the silver medal at the 1985 Pacific Conference Games (100 m), finished sixth at the 1987 World Indoor Championships (200 m), seventh at the 1987 Pan American Games 100 m and fourth at the 1987 Pan American Games 200 m. She also competed at the 1987 World Championships (100 m) without reaching the final.

In the 4 × 100 metres relay she won a silver medal at the 1985 Pacific Conference Games, finished fourth at the 1985 World Cup, won a silver medal at the 1986 Commonwealth Games and finished sixth at the 1987 World Championships. She also competed at the 1988 Summer Olympics without reaching the final.

She ran collegiately for the LSU Tigers.

References

External links
 
 

1964 births
Living people
Sportspeople from Leeds
English emigrants to Canada
Canadian female sprinters
Athletes (track and field) at the 1988 Summer Olympics
Olympic track and field athletes of Canada
World Athletics Championships athletes for Canada
Commonwealth Games silver medallists for Canada
Commonwealth Games medallists in athletics
Athletes (track and field) at the 1986 Commonwealth Games
Pan American Games track and field athletes for Canada
Athletes (track and field) at the 1987 Pan American Games
LSU Tigers track and field athletes
Olympic female sprinters
Medallists at the 1986 Commonwealth Games